The British Academy consists of world-leading scholars and researchers in the humanities and social sciences. Each year, it elects fellows to its membership. The following were elected in the 1960s.

1960
 Professor E. H. Phelps Brown
 Rev. Professor Henry Chadwick
 Sir Oliver Franks
 P. M. Fraser
 Professor E. H. J. Gombrich
 Canon S. L. Greenslade
 R. W. Hamilton
 Professor S. N. Hampshire
 Professor R. F. Kahn
 Lord Nathan of Churt
 Professor M. Roberts
 Professor J. J. Seznec
 R. W. Southern
 P. F. Strawson

1961
 Rev. Professor C. K. Barrett
 Dr T. S. R. Boase
 Professor John Brough
 Professor J. E. Butt
 Professor A. K. Cairncross
 Professor J. D. Clark
 Dr R. W. Hunt
 Russell Meiggs
 Margery Perham

1962
 Dr R. D. Barnett
 Rev. Professor W. O. Chadwick
 Dr I. E. S. Edwards
 Professor H. L. A. Hart
 Dr Otto Kurz
 M. M. Lascelles
 J. P. Plamenatz
 Professor G. O. Sayles

1963
 D. F. Allen
 Dr W. H. Bruford
 Professor Eleanora Carus-Wilson
 H. M. Colvin
 Lord Devlin
 Professor Norman Gash
 Nicholas Kaldor
 Rev. Professor G. W. H. Lampe
 J. B. Leishman
 Professor Bernard Lewis 
 Professor A. N. Prior
 T. C. Skeat
 Beryl Smalley

1964
 Professor C. O. Brink
 Professor D. V. Glass
 R. M. Hare
 Professor G. W. Keeton
 Professor A. K. S. Lambton
 K. B. McFarlane
 D. Mahon
 Professor E. A. Thompson
 Professor E. M. Wilson

1965
 Professor G. C. Allen
 Professor E. Badian
 W. S. Barrett
 Professor A. F. L. Beeston
 C. E. Blunt
 Dr E. S. de Beer
 Professor H. Butterfield
 P. T. Geach
 L. C. B. Gower
 Professor H. J. Habakkuk
 Dr F. Ll. Harrison
 Dr Lilian H. Jeffery
 Professor E. M. Jope
 Professor O. Kahn-Freund
 Rev. Canon J. N. D. Kelly
 Dr C. A. Macartney
 Professor N. B. L. Pevsner
 Professor Kathleen M. Tillotson
 Professor Edward Ullendorf
 Professor T. B. L. Webster

1966
 Professor Geoffrey Bullough
 Martin Davies
 V. R. d'A. Desborough
 Professor A. G. Dickens
 Professor K. J. Dover
 Professor Daryll Forde
 Basil Gray
 H. P. Grice
 John Hajnal
 Dr J. E. C. Hill
 Professor R. M. Jackson
 Professor P. H. J. Lloyd-Jones
 Dr C. B. M. McBurney
 Sir Donald MacDougall
 Henry Moore
 Dr J. H. C. Morris
 Rev. Professor C. F. D. Moule
 Dr J. N. L. Myres
 Professor M. J. Oakeshott
 Robert Shackleton
 Professor D. Winton Thomas
 Professor C. H. Wilson
 Professor D. J. Wiseman
 Professor R. C. Zaehner

1967
 G. E. M. Anscombe
 J. P. V. D. Balsdon
 Professor W. G. Beasley
 R. N. W. Blake
 A. L. C. Bullock
 John Chadwick
 R. C. Cobb
 Professor A. R. N. Cross
 Rev. Professor F. L. Cross
 Professor H. C. Darby
 Professor G. R. Elton
 Professor Meyer Fortes
 Dr Ilya Gershevitch
 Professor Stephen Korner
 Dr A. H. McDonald
 Professor S. F. C. Milsom
 R. G. M. Nisbet
 W. B. Reddaway
 Dr Audrey I. Richards
 Professor C. M. Robertson
 Professor G. L. S. Shackle
 Professor Geoffrey Tillotson
 Professor D. C. Twitchett
 Dr Margaret D. Whinney
 Dr Frances A. Yates

1968
 Professor L. J. Austin
 Professor W. H. B. Court
 M. A. E. Dummett
 Rev. Dr. A. M. Farrer
 Professor F. M. Gluckman
 Professor Malcolm Guthrie
 Professor N. G. L. Hammond
 Professor George Kane
 E. J. Kenney
 R. W. Ketton-Cremer
 Professor W. J. M. Mackenzie
 Professor R. C. O. Matthews
 Professor J. H. Plumb
 Viscount Radcliffe
 Professor J. S. Roskell
 Professor F. H. Sandbach
 Professor J. B. Segal
 Professor Harry Street
 Professor A. D. Trendall
 Professor Walter Ullmann
 Professor George Zarnecki

1969
 Prof. Dr. Kurt Aland
 Rev. Professor James Barr
 Professor Eric Birley
 John Boardman
 P. A. Brunt
 Professor Norman Davis
 Professor E. W. Handley
 Professor W. G. Hoskins
 Professor H. G. Johnson
 Dr R. A. Leigh
 Professor C. A. Moser
 Rt Rev. S. C. Neill
 Professor H. G. Nicholas
 Professor G. E. L. Owen
 Professor G. H. N. Seton-Watson
 Dr D. L. Snellgrove
 Professor H. R. Trevor-Roper
 Professor H. W. R. Wade
 Dr J. M. Wallace-Hadrill
 Professor W. H. Walsh
 F. J. Watson

See also
 Fellows of the British Academy

References
The above names are taken from the British Academy Annual Reports, found in the Proceedings of the British Academy for the years 1960 to 1969. The names are included annually under the first subsection, "Deaths and elections of fellows".